Winton is a suburb of Bournemouth in Dorset, England (historically in Hampshire). Winton is to the east of Wallisdown, Victoria Park and Talbot Woods and south of Moordown.

Winton gave its name to Winton, Queensland.

History
The name Winton was derived from Wintoun Castle in Scotland, which was home to the Archibald Montgomerie, 13th Earl of Eglinton, a relative of the Talbot family: landowners who started the development of Winton.

At the beginning of the 19th century the area was just rough heathland, with just a track linking ancient Moordown Village to Horseshoe Common. In 1805 this all changed when a new main road through Winton was put in and named Muscliff Road (today it is known as Wimborne Road).

Around 1850, wealthy Scottish philanthropists Georgina and Mary Talbot  saw the plight of local workers and set about trying to improve their lives by purchasing land along the road and building four artisan cottages and sinking wells to provide fresh water. They founded Talbot Village.

By 1891 the population of Winton had reached 4,000 and by 1894 the needs of Winton were so great that they were put under the care of the Winton Parish Council and later in 1897 Winton Urban District Council was formed. In 1901 Bournemouth (which was by then a county borough) increased its boundaries to include Winton and other districts.

Landmarks & Buildings

Winton Recreation Ground
 Winton Recreation Ground is the only significant green space in an area of approximately one square mile, serving a population of 4750 people.

The idea of creating a public recreation facility for Winton was first envisaged in 1902. The Earl of Malmesbury gave nearly six hectares of suitable land to Bournemouth Borough Council in 1904. The official opening of Winton Recreation Ground took place in September 1906.

The facilities available at the ground include Richmond Park Bowls Club, tennis courts, cycle track, children's playground, playgroups play building and a cricket pitch.

The cricket pavilion is over  90 years old and it was extended in 1962 and refurbished in 1999.

Winton Banks
This busy road junction in Winton is called Winton Banks thanks to the many banks that used to surround this junction.

Continental Cinema
The picture (right) is close to where the Continental Cinema once stood. Opened in 1911 it started life as the Winton Hall and was renamed Winton Electric Picture House the following year. In 1930 it was modernised and renamed Plaza, becoming the first cinema in Bournemouth to  show talking pictures. After the war years it was again refurbished and renamed the Continental. In 1978 it changed hands but the cinema took a downturn in the 1980s due to lack of maintenance and it ended its life in 1989 when it was demolished to build a pub.

Peter's Hill
The steep rise in Wimborne Road to the north of Kemp and Wycliffe roads, has been known locally for many years as Peter's Hill, with several stories circulating as to the origin of the name, the least fanciful would seem to be that the spire of Saint Peter's Church in Bournemouth could be glimpsed from the top of the hill. Evidence of the name dates to 1871, soon after Winton was formed, when Henry Vatcher a carter living with his wife two children and two lodgers, gives Peter's Hill as his address on the census.

Winton Library

Winton library was opened in 1907 and became Bournemouth's first permanent purpose-built library. It was built on land provided by landowner Lord Leven with financial support from Scottish-American philanthropist Andrew Carnegie. It was one of the first public libraries in the country to allow open access to the shelves; and it was here that Flora Thompson read the literature on which she based her literary career culminating in her autobiographical trilogy Lark Rise to Candleford.

The library has undergone a number of refurbishments during its lifetime, the most recent in 2006 when a computer suite was added.

Present day
Today Winton is still popular for shopping, including a regular farmers' market which takes place in Cardigan Road. The area has several striking buildings, such as Saint Luke’s Church, the old Fire Station on Peter’s Hill, the Edwardian library in Wimborne Road, and what was the art-deco Moderne Cinema building, now known as the Lifecentre, having undergone a complete refurbishment maintaining the art-deco theme.

Winton is also a popular area for students of Bournemouth University and The Arts University Bournemouth to live in, given its local amenities, bus connections to the town centre and proximity to Talbot Campus, the university's main site and the AUB campus.

Timeline
Circa 1850      Philanthropists Georgina & Marianne Talbot purchase land on the main Wimborne Road. The beginning of the development of Talbot Village.
1862            Seven almhouses designed by Christopher Crabb Creeke are built for the old and infirm. They are constructed of Portland stone.
             Talbot Village School erected with room for 68 pupils.
1870            St Mark's Church completed at a cost of £5000. The building consists of Portland and Purbeck stone.
1894            Winton becomes a civil parish.
1897            Winton Urban District Council is formed.
1901            Bournemouth extends its boundaries to include Winton.

             Winton gets its own police station. It is established in a building built ten years earlier known as Hamilton towers.

1902            Horsedrawn carriages are replaced by trams.
1903            The first fire station is established. It is staffed by volunteers and the fire engine is a horse drawn pump.
1906            Winton Recreation Ground is officially opened.
1907            Winton library opens.
1911            The Continental Cinema opens.
1933            Woolworths open their 513th branch. Closed in 2008.

Politics 
Winton is part of two wards for elections to Bournemouth, Christchurch and Poole Council; Winton East and Wallisdown and Winton West.

References

 BH Life, January/February 2006 edition
 https://www.geograph.org.uk
http://www.wintonforum.co.uk, Winton History and Community Notices

External links

 Winton Forum - Community group and website providing news, history and comprehensive information about Winton, Bournemouth

Areas of Bournemouth